El Crack is a 1960 Argentine film produced and directed by José A. Martínez Suárez.
The script was written by José A. Martínez Suárez, Carlos Alberto Parrilla and Solly Schroder, based on the book by Jose A. Gerino. The music was done by Ástor Piazzolla and Víctor Schilchter; and the production company was Alithia Cinematográfica. Photography by Humberto Peruzzi.

Synopsis
The setting is the business side of professional football, especially the dark underbelly of the business, including bribes, drugs, and a variety of types of questionable manipulation.

References

External links
 

1960 films
1960s Spanish-language films
Argentine black-and-white films
Films directed by José A. Martínez Suárez
Argentine romantic comedy-drama films
1960s Argentine films